The Pittsburghers is a Barbershop quartet that won the 1948 SPEBSQSA international competition.

References
 AIC entry
 AIC entry (archived, includes more information)

Barbershop quartets
Barbershop Harmony Society